Cheshire and Wirral Partnership NHS Foundation Trust (CWP) provides  mental health services, learning disability services and substance misuse services across Cheshire and Wirral, England. Additionally it provides various specialist services in Liverpool, Bolton, Warrington, Halton and Trafford, and community health services in Western Cheshire.

CWP has around 15,000 foundation trust members. It employs more than 3,400 staff across 65 sites and serves a population of over a million people.

In July 2013 the trust selected Ryhurst Ltd as preferred bidder for a comprehensive range of Facilities Management services in a partnership which will last for an initial 15-year period, with an option to extend for a further five years.

Facilities
The trust runs a Health and Education Assessment Unit at Adcote House where Pets as Therapy are involved. It runs three general practices in Cheshire: Old Hall Surgery in Ellesmere Port,  Westminster Surgery and Willaston Surgery, taken over as the practices could not recruit new partners.

Performance
It was named by the Health Service Journal as one of the top hundred NHS trusts to work for in 2015.  At that time it had 2,986 full-time equivalent staff and a sickness absence rate of 5.61%. 67% of staff recommend it as a place for treatment and 61% recommended it as a place to work.  In the 2016 NHS Staff Survey it did best of all mental health, learning disability and community trusts.

References

NHS foundation trusts
Health in Cheshire
Medical and health organisations based in Merseyside